Karl Zeerleder (31 December 1780 in Bern – 28 June 1851 in Mont Vully) was a Swiss politician who served as the first mayor of Bern.

Personal life 
Karl Zeerleder came from the Bern patrician family Zeerleder; his father worked as a banker. He was homeschooled and followed further education in a presbytery. He defended Bern in 1798 during the raid of the French revolutionary troops.

Political career 
He served as the Secretary of the Judicial Council of the Helvetic Republic and was a member of the Grand Council from 1814 to 1819. From 1819 to 1824 he was chief official (Oberamtmann) in Aarwangen Castle. He was also a member of the Small Council of Bern from 1824 to 1830

Zeerleder was also one of the founders and later chairman from 1831 to 1840 of the Swiss historian searching society (Schweizerischen geschichtforschenden Gesellschaft), he made the book: Documents for the history of the city of Bern and its earliest territory until the end of the thirteenth century (Urkunden für die Geschichte des Stadt Bern und ihres frühesten Gebietes bis zum Schluss des dreizehnten Jahrhunderts). He was also Chairman of the public library.

He became the first Mayor (Gemeindepräsident) of Bern in 1832 and held that office until 1848. When the Federal Republic of Switzerland was founded in 1848, he was replaced by Friedrich Ludwig von Effinge. After his duty as mayor was over, he retired from politics and died in 1851 on his estate in Mont Vully.

See also 
 List of mayors of Bern

References

Mayors of Bern
1780 births
1851 deaths